Granville Leveson Proby, 4th Earl of Carysfort  (14 September 1824 – 18 May 1872), styled Lord Proby from 1858 to 1868, was a British Liberal politician. He notably held office as Comptroller of the Household between 1859 and 1866.

Background and early life
Proby was born at Bushey Park, Enniskerry, County Wicklow, the second son of Admiral Granville Leveson Proby, 3rd Earl of Carysfort, by Isabella Howard, daughter of the Honourable Hugh Howard. He became known by the courtesy title Lord Proby in 1858 on the death of his elder brother. He served with the 74th Regiment of Foot and achieved the rank of captain.

Political career
In 1858 Proby was elected to the House of Commons for County Wicklow, and served under Lord Palmerston and then Lord Russell as Comptroller of the Household from 1859 to 1866. In 1868 he succeeded his father in the earldom and entered the House of Lords. He was admitted to the Privy Council in 1859 and made a Knight of the Order of St Patrick in 1869.

Family
Lord Carysfort married Lady Augusta Maria Hare, daughter of William Hare, 2nd Earl of Listowel, in 1853. The marriage was childless. He died in Florence, Italy, in May 1872, aged 47, and was succeeded in his titles by his younger brother, William. The Countess of Carysfort died at Grosvenor Crescent, London, in March 1881, aged 48.

References

External links 
 

1824 births
1872 deaths
Knights of St Patrick
Members of the Privy Council of the United Kingdom
Members of the Parliament of the United Kingdom for County Wicklow constituencies (1801–1922)
UK MPs 1857–1859
UK MPs 1859–1865
UK MPs 1865–1868
Carysfort, E4
74th Highlanders officers
Earls of Carysfort